Úrsula Martín Oñate (born 1 June 1976) is a Spanish judoka. She competed in the women's middleweight event at the 2000 Summer Olympics in Sydney.

References

External links
 

1976 births
Living people
Spanish female judoka
Olympic judoka of Spain
Judoka at the 2000 Summer Olympics
Sportspeople from Madrid